Globoid may refer to:

 Globoid, a trade name for Aspirin
Globoid (botany), a spherical body seen in early plant development that contains nutrients
A type of worm gearing